Kandiyanallur is a village located south west of Chennai in Tamil Nadu, India. It is a part of Vandavasi Taluk in the district of Thiruvannamalai. According to the 2011 Government of India Census data, there are a total of 79 families residing in the village. The population is 270 of which 138 are male and 132 are female. The village is administrated by an elected Sarpanch. The primary occupation of the villagers is Agriculture.

Politics 
Kandiyanallur comes under the Vandavasi Vidhan Sabha constituency of the State of Tamil Nadu. This seat is reserved for Scheduled Caste

The winner of the 2016 Vidhan Sabha election was Ambethkumar, S from DMK with 80206 votes and runner up was Meganathan, V from AIADMK with 62138 votes.

Previous results are listed below

Education 
PUPS-KANDIYANALLUR is a Tamil medium co-educational school located in the village. School is approved for Primary level education and works under the management of Local body.

News 
In 2010, seven ancient apparently Panchaloha idols were unearthed around an ancient Siva temple.

References

Villages in Tiruvannamalai district